The Glossopteridaceae are an extinct family of plants belonging to Pteridospermatophyta, or seed ferns.

References

Pteridospermatophyta
Prehistoric plant families
Permian plants
Lopingian first appearances
Lopingian extinctions